London Buses route 132 is a Transport for London contracted bus route in London, England. Running between Bexleyheath and North Greenwich bus station, it is operated by London Central.

History

On 24 January 2009, the route was extended westwards via the Greenwich Peninsula to North Greenwich bus station. On 3 October 2009, East Thames Buses was sold to London General, which included a five-year contract to operate route 132. On 7 November 2009, the allocation was transferred to London Central's Bexleyheath garage.

Since October 2009, part of the route from Eltham to Bexleyheath has been covered at night by night bus route N21.

During the London 2012 Olympics, the route was temporarily converted from single-decker to double-decker operation. The route was permanently converted to double-decker operation in December 2012.

On 12 September 2015, the route gained a 24-hour service on Friday and Saturday nights.

In January 2020, the daytime frequency of the route was increased from a bus every 10 minutes to a bus every eight minutes.

In November 2020, Transport for London announced that the route would be operated by electric double-decker buses. On 9 July 2022, the route began converting to electric bus operation with BYD Alexander Dennis Enviro400EV vehicles. To cater for these vehicles, a pantograph charger was installed at Bexleyheath bus garage to allow rapid charging to 'top up' the battery during the day.

Current route
Route 132 operates via these primary locations:
 Bexleyheath Shopping Centre
 Bexley Village 
 Blendon
 Blackfen
 Avery Hill
 Eltham High Street
 Eltham Station 
 Kidbrooke, Rochester Way
 Greenwich Peninsula
 Millennium Village
 North Greenwich bus station  for North Greenwich Station

References
References

Notes

External links

Bus routes in London
Transport in the London Borough of Bexley
Transport in the Royal Borough of Greenwich